The King of Ulster (Old Irish: Rí Ulad, Modern Irish: Rí Uladh) also known as the King of Ulaid and King of the Ulaid, was any of the kings of the Irish provincial over-kingdom of Ulaid. The title rí in Chóicid, which means "king of the Fifth", was also sometimes used.

Originally referring to the rulers of the Ulaid of legend and the vastly reduced territory of the historical Ulaid, the title rí Ulad ceased to exist after the Norman invasion of Ulaid in 1177 and the subsequent foundation of the Earldom of Ulster. The Mac Dúinnshléibe dynasty of Ulaid (English: Donleavy / Dunleavy) were given the title of rex Hibernicorum Ulidiae, meaning "king of the Irish of Ulaid", until the extinction of their dynasty by the end of the 13th century.

After the earldom's collapse in 1333, the title was resurrected and usurped after 1364 by the Ulaid's chief Gaelic rivals the Northern Uí Néill, who had overrun the ruins of the earldom and established the renamed tuath of Clandeboye. The Northern Uí Néill had achieved dominance over the north of Ireland, with their territory corresponding largely to the modern day province of Ulster. The title thus came to apply to their territory, which they likewise renamed Ulaid, now reflecting an area roughly corresponding to the extent of Ulaid in legend. "Prince of Ulster" became a common title for The O'Neill (In Irish: Ui Neill) until the Flight of the Earls in 1607.

Legendary kings

Eber Donn 
Cimbáeth
Macha Mong Ruad
Fergus mac Léti
Congal Cláiringnech
Ross Ruad
Eochaid Sálbuide
Fergus mac Róich
Conchobar mac Nessa
Cúscraid mac Conchobar
Fíatach Finn
Éllim mac Conrach
Mal mac Rochride
Tipraiti Tireach
Áengus Goibnenn mac Fergus Gallen mheic Tibraide Tirech
Fergus Dubdétach
Aengus Finn mac Fergus Dubdétach
Lugaid Lorc mac Áengus Finn
Dub mac Fomor mheic Airgetmar
Fiachu Araide mac Áengus Goibnenn mheic Fergus Gallen
Fedlimid mac Cas mheic Fiachu Araide
Imchad mac Fedlimid
Ros mac Imchad
Cronn Badruí mac Eochaid mheic Lugaid mac Ros mac Imchad
Fergus Foga mac Fraechar Foirtriun
Cáelbad mac Cronn Badruí
Sárán mac Cóelbad
Mihail

Historic kings

Forga mac Dallán mheic Dubthach mac Mianach mac of Lugaid Lorc d. 465?
Muiredach Muinderg mac Forga mac Dallan 465–489
Eochaid mac Muiredaig Muinderg   489–509
Cairell mac Muiredaig Muinderg   509–532
Eochaid mac Condlai mac Caolbad  532–553
Fergnae mac Oengusso Ibdaig    553–557
Demmán mac Cairell             557–572
Báetán mac Cairill             572–581
Áed Dub mac Suibni      (died 588)
Fiachnae mac Báetáin (Fiachnae Lurgan) 588–626
Fiachnae mac Demmáin           626–627
Congal Cáech (Congal mac Sgánnail) 627–637
Dúnchad mac Fiachnai     (died c. 644)
Máel Cobo mac Fiachnai        (died 647)
Blathmac mac Máele Cobo     (died 670)
Congal Cennfota mac Dúnchada  (died 674)
Fergus mac Áedáin             674–692
Bécc Bairrche mac Blathmaic   692–707
Cú Chuarán mac Dúngail Eilni  707–708
Áed Róin mac Bécce Bairrche   708–735
Cathussach mac Ailello        735–749
Bressal mac Áedo Róin         749–750
Fiachnae mac Áedo Róin        750–789
Tommaltach mac Indrechtaig    789–790
Eochaid mac Fiachnai          790–810
Cairell mac Fiachnai          810–819
Máel Bressail mac Ailillo     819–825
Muiredach mac Eochada         825–839
Matudán mac Muiredaig         839–857
Lethlobar mac Loingsig        857–873
Cathalán mac Indrechtaig      857–871
Ainbíth mac Áedo              873–882
Eochocán mac Áedo             882–883
Airemón mac Áedo              882–886
Fiachnae mac Ainbítha         886–886
Bécc mac Airemóin             886–893
Muiredach mac Eochocáin       893–895
Máel Mocheirge mac Indrechtaig 893–896
Aitíth mac Laigni             896–898
Cenn Etig mac Lethlobair       896–900
Áed mac Eochocáin          898–919
Dubgall mac Áeda               919–925
Loingsech mac Cinn Etig        925–932
Eochaid mac Conaill            932–937
Matudán mac Áeda               937–950
Ardgal mac Matudáin            950–970
Niall mac Áeda                 970–971
Áed mac Loingsig               971–972
Eochaid mac Ardgail            972–1004
Gilla Comgaill mac Ardgail     1004–1005
Máel Ruanaid mac Ardgail       1005–1007
Matudán mac Domnaill           1007–1007
Dub Tuinne ("In Torc") mac Eochada 1007–1007
Domnall mac Duibh Thuinne      1007–1007
Niall mac Duib Thuinne         1007–1016
Muiredach mac Matudáin         1007–1008
Niall mac Eochada          1016–1063
Eochaid mac Néill meic Eochada ????–1062
Donnchad Ua Mathgamna          1063–1065
Cú Ulad Ua Flaithrí            1065–1071
Lochlainn Ua Máel Ruanaid      1071–1071
Donn Sléibe mac Eochada   1071–1078
Áed Meranach Ua hEochada       1078–1080
Goll na Gorta Ua Mathgamna     1080–1081
Donn Sléibe mac Eochada        1081–1091
Donnchad mac Duinn Sléibe      1091–1095
Eochaid mac Duinn Sléibe       1095–1099
Donnchad mac Duinn Sléibe      1099–1099
Eochaid mac Duinn Sléibe       1099–1108
Donnchad mac Duinn Sléibe      1108–1113
Áed mac Duinn Sléibe           1113–1127
Eochaid Ua Mathgamna           1113–1127
Ragnall Ua hEochada            1127–1131
Cú Ulad mac Conchobair Chisenaig Mac Duinn Sléibe  1131–1157
Áed mac Con Ulad Mac Duinn Sléibe  1157–1158
Eochaid mac Con Ulad Mac Duinn Sléibe  1158–1166
Magnus mac Con Ulad Mac Duinn Sléibe  1166–1171
Donn Sléibe mac Con Ulad Mac Duinn Sléibe  1171–1172
Ruaidrí mac Con Ulad Mac Duinn Sléibe  1172–1201

See List of rulers of Tyrone for the Northern Uí Néill kings of Ulster after the resurrection of the title in 1364.

See also
 List of kings of Ailech
 List of rulers of Tír Eoghain
 Kings of Tír Chonaill
 List of kings of Airgíalla
 List of kings of Connacht
 List of kings of Leinster
 List of Kings of Mide
 List of kings of Munster
 List of High Kings of Ireland

Notes

Sources
 
 
"Annals of the Four Masters", 1990 edition.
"Annals of Connacht", A. Martin Freeman, 1944.
"Irish Kings and High Kings", Francis John Byrne, 1973.
"Leabhar Mor Genealach", Dubhaltach Mac Fhirbhisigh, ed. O'Muralie, 2004.
Annals of Ulster

External links
Kingdom of Ulster

Ulster